The  2009–10  Arema Indonesia season is Arema's 23rd competitive season. The club will compete in Indonesia Super League and Piala Indonesia. Arema Indonesia a professional football club based in Malang, East Java, Indonesia. The season covers the period from 1 July 2009 to 1 August 2010.

Coaching staff

Squad information

First-team squad

Transfers

In:

Out:

Competitions

Overview

Top scorers
The list is sorted by shirt number when total goals are equal.

References 

Arema FC seasons
Indonesian football clubs 2009–10 season